Biller is an Anglo Saxon and German surname, and it's a variant of Buhler. Notable people with the surname include:

Anna Biller, independent American filmmaker
Georg Christoph Biller (1955–2022), German choral conductor of the Thomanerchor
John Biller (1879–1960), American athlete who competed mainly in the standing jumps
José Biller, American cardiologist
Kenneth Biller, TV producer, TV writer, TV director and TV editor, best known for Star Trek: Voyager
Maxim Biller (born 1960), German writer
Nikola Biller-Andorno, German bioethicist
Stefanie Biller (born 1985), long-distance swimmer from Germany